Tyrone Garner (born July 27, 1978) is a Canadian former professional ice hockey player.  He was drafted by the New York Islanders in the fourth round, 83rd overall in the 1996 NHL Entry Draft.

Playing career

Juniors
Garner played three NHL games in his career, for the Calgary Flames in 1998–99 as an emergency callup from his junior team, the Oshawa Generals.  He posted a 0–2–0 record with a 5.18 GAA before being returned to the Generals where he was named to the Ontario Hockey League's second All-Star Team in 1999.

Professional
Garner spent most of his North American career in the ECHL before moving to play in Europe in 2003.  He was named the co-winner of the ECHL's playoff Most Valuable player award in 2002 while a member of the Greenville Grrrowl.

While playing in Norway during the 2005–06 season, Garner suffered a horrible groin injury which ripped the muscles from the bone. Doctors told him that under no circumstances could Garner play as a goaltender for at least one year. So he skated as a forward with the Southern Professional Hockey League's Jacksonville Barracudas, where he scored 12 goals and 22 points in 47 games. He remained with the Barracudas during the 2007-08 SPHL season, where he scored 12 goals and 27 points in 41 games.

Garner also played as a forward with the Brantford Blast of Major League Hockey during the 2008-09 OHA Sr League season, where he scored 11 points in 13 games.

References

External links

Garner continues hockey journey in Jacksonville

1978 births
Living people
Black Canadian ice hockey players
Brisbane Blue Tongues players
Calgary Flames players
Canadian ice hockey goaltenders
Dayton Bombers players
Greenville Grrrowl players
Ice hockey people from Ontario
Sportspeople from Hamilton, Ontario
Jackson Bandits players
Jacksonville Barracudas (SPHL) players
Johnstown Chiefs players
New York Islanders draft picks
Oshawa Generals players
Saint John Flames players
San Antonio Rampage players
Canadian expatriate ice hockey players in the United States